Donja Bela Reka may refer to:
 Donja Bela Reka (Bor), a village in Bar Municipality, Serbia
 Donja Bela Reka (Nova Varoš), a village in Nova Varoš Municipality, Serbia

See also 
 Gornja Bela Reka (disambiguation)
 Bela Reka (disambiguation)